Park Seung-jung is a South Korean cardiologist. Currently he is chairman of the Heart Institute at Asan Medical Center in Seoul and professor of medicine at University of Ulsan.

Career
Park is currently serving as a Chairman of Board of Trustees at CardioVascular Research Foundation, and as a course director, he has been organizing the annual conference, CardioVascular Summit-TCT Asia Pacific, since 1996.

1996 -          Advisory Board Asian-Pacific Society of Interventional Cardiology
1996 -          Associate Professor of Medicine Chief, Division of Interventional Cardiology Cardiovascular Center, Asan Medical Center University of Ulsan, College of Medicine, Seoul, Korea
1998 -          Editorial Board Interventional Cardiology Bulletin
2000 -          Professor of Medicine Chief, Division of Interventional Cardiology Cardiovascular Center, Asan Medical Center University of Ulsan College of Medicine, Seoul, Korea
2002 -          Chairman Cardio Vascular Research Foundation
2004 -          Editorial Board Current Cardiology Reviews
2004 -          Editorial Advisory Future Cardiology
2004.3 - 2008.2  Chairman The Korean Society of Interventional Cardiology
2004.12 -       Director  Clinical Research Center for Ischemic Heart Disease
2006 - 2008     President  Asian Pacific Society of Interventional Cardiology
2006.09 -       Director Asan Heart Institute
2006 - 2010     Editorial Board Catheterization and Cardiovascular Interventions 
2008.02 -       Associate Editor for the Pacific Rim Euro Intervention
2008.02 -        Editorial Board Journal of American College of Cardiology: Cardiovasular Interventions
2008.07 - 2010    International Advisory Board Circulation Journal-The Japanese Circulation Society
2008 - 2010     Editorial Board The American Journal of Cardiology 
2009 - 2011      International Associate Editor European Heart Journal    
2009 - 2011      Associate Editor Interventional Cardiology
2009 - 2010     Director, International Affairs Committee The Korean Society of Cardiology
2009.7 -         International Associate Editor Circulation Journal - The Japanese Circulation Society
2009.11.23 -     Chairman Heart Institute, Asan Medical Center

Grants and awards
1991 - 1993   NSF grant DMS-9106444
1997 - 2001   NSF grant DMS-9701489 :‘Effective Diophantine Geometry over FunctionFields’.
1998 -  2002   NSF Group Infrastructure Grant : ‘Southwestern Center for Arithmetic Geometry’, Co-PI with six other researchers from the University of Arizona, UTexas Austin, USC, and the University of New Mexico.
2003 - 2006   NSF Infrastructure grant : ‘Southwestern Center for Arithmetic Geometry’, Co-PI with nine other researchers from the University of Arizona, UTexas Austin, USC, UC Berkeley, and the University of New Mexico.
2005 - 2008   NSF grant DMS-0500504 : ‘Motivic fundamental groups, multiple polylogarithms, and Diophantine geometry’.
2006 - 2008  Japan Society for the Promotion of Science, Core-to-Core program ‘New Developments of Arithmetic Geometry, Motive, Galois Theory, and Their Practical Applications,’ Foreign member
2008         EPSRC grant, 46437, for workshop ‘Non-commutative constructions in arithmetic and geometry’
2009        EPSRC grant, EP/G024979/1, 3-year project on ‘Non-commutative fundamental groups in Diophantine geometry’, March

Awards
2020: Ho-Am Prize in Medicine
2011: Asan Award in Medicine
2011: Best Impression of Science and Technology, Republic of Korea
2008: TCT Award (Career Achievement Award) 
2005: The Ethica Award, EuroPCR

References

External links
Youtube.com
European Heart Journal - My Cardio Interview: Seung Jung-Park & Thomas Luscher (04-27-2011)
ACC 2011: Seung-Jung Park, MD for PRECOMBAT (04-06-2011) AHA Science News Video Interview from ACC 2011 with Mariell Jessup, MD, FAHA and Seung-Jung Park, MD on behalf of the PRECOMBAT investigators
Cardio Tube Interview with Seung-Jung Park, MD from TCTAP 2011 conference in Seoul, Korea (08-11-2011)
AMC Int'l News - The 4th Asan Medical Award (06-02-2011)
AMC News (04-28-2011): Dr. Seung-Jung Park publishes fourth paper in NEJM
CardioVascular Research Foundation Website
Summitmd.com
CardioVascular Summit-TCTAP
Imaging and Physiology Summit
TAVI Summit

South Korean cardiologists
Living people
20th-century South Korean physicians
21st-century South Korean physicians
Year of birth missing (living people)
Recipients of the Ho-Am Prize in Medicine